Rama Temple (also known as Ram Kund Temple) is situated in Saidpur Village, Islamabad, Pakistan. The temple is dedicated to the Hindu God Rama who Hindus believe lived in the area with his family during 14 years of their exile. The temple is built in the 16th century. According to official records dating back to 1893, a fair was held each year at a pond near the site called "Ram Kund" to commemorate that Ram and his family had once sipped water from it. For centuries, Hindus have travelled far and wide to worship at the temple, staying in an adjoining Dharamshala (a type of building) (rest house for pilgrims). However, all the idols have now been removed.

See also

 Hinduism in Pakistan
 Evacuee Trust Property Board
 Hinglaj Mata
 Shivaharkaray
 Krishna Temple, Islamabad

References

Islamabad
Hindu temples in Pakistan
Buildings and structures in Islamabad
Religious buildings and structures in Islamabad